Falah Hassan al-Zidan Al Luhaibi  (born in Mosul, 1968) is an Iraqi politician and Minister of Agriculture.

Academic achievement and the places where he worked
 Bachelor of Civil Engineering / Mustansiriya University
 Graduation year / 1996–1997
1 – Worked in the field of specialization in various companies in the private sector from 1998 to 2005 and the last executive director of Eagle General Contracting Co. Ltd.

2 – Member of the House of Representatives in its first session 2006–2010

3 – Member of the Committee of Services in the House of Representatives in 2006–2007

4 – Member of the Security and Defense Committee in the House of Representatives 2008–2010

5. Member of the House of Representatives at its second session 2010–2014

6 – Member of the Security and Defense Committee in the House of Representatives 2010–2014

7 – Member of the House of Representatives in its third session 2014

8 – Minister of Agriculture in the Government of 2014

References

External links
Official website

Iraqi politicians
People from Mosul
Iraqi Muslims
Living people
1968 births
Agriculture ministers of Iraq